Super Slimey is a collaborative commercial mixtape by American rappers Future and Young Thug. It was released on October 20, 2017, by 300 Entertainment, Atlantic Records, Epic Records, Freebandz, and YSL Records. The mixtape features a sole guest appearance from Offset. It also features production from Southside, Richie Souf, Wheezy, and Fuse, among others.

Background
In 2016, there were rumors that was circulating that Future and Young Thug were working on a project. Throughout 2017, Future and Young Thug posted pictures of themselves in the studio together through social media. The mixtape's release and cover art was announced a day before release on October 19, 2017 by the two rappers through their social media accounts.

Critical reception

Super Slimey was met with generally positive reviews. At Metacritic, which assigns a normalized rating out of 100 to reviews from mainstream publications, the album received an average score of 66, based on five reviews.

Online publication HotNewHipHop stated there was a lack of creativity, stating: "Quickly, however, it becomes clear that Future and Thug may not have as much chemistry as it would appear on paper. Thug and Future don't really do either. Instead, it feels more like a mixed bag collection of songs, some feeling unfinished and barely mixed, some feeling more formulaic ("insert verse here" type). Future and Young Thug should have chemistry, easily, which is all the more reason that they should have pushed themselves a step further." Calum Slingerland of Exclaim! believed that "the two collaborators have trouble finding common ground here. They're equally impressive in their own right – Future feeds his codeine paranoia on "Feed Me Dope" and gravelly closer "Group Home", while Thug jovially rides the peaks and valleys of the booming, ebullient "Cruise Ship" before crooning over the Biggie-interpolating guitars of "Killed Before" – but they rarely connect, and when they try on each other's styles, it's awkward".

In a mixed review, Sheldon Pearce of Pitchfork noted that "neither Future nor Thug is at the peak of his powers on Super Slimey, which forgoes explosiveness and poignancy for streamlined action, and many of the solo cuts shine brighter than the team-ups. Most of the songs are never greater than the sum of their parts. Even when the verses and hooks aren't pedestrian (by their standards), the segments seem cut together. But there are moments like the Offset-assisted "Patek Water" or "200" where the stars align and they seem like perfect companions, or at least sparring partners. Even when they don't click, you sometimes end up with two dynamic MCs trying to dunk on each other. If anything, Super Slimey is a reminder that compromise isn't always productive".

Commercial performance
Super Slimey debuted at number two on the US Billboard 200 with 75,000 album-equivalent units, of which 15,000 were pure album sales in its first week of release. The album dropped to the number nine in its second week, earning an additional 31,000 album-equivalent units.

Track listing
Credits adapted from Tidal and BMI.

Notes
  signifies an uncredited co-producer

Charts

Weekly charts

Year-end charts

References

2017 mixtape albums
Future (rapper) albums
Young Thug albums
Albums produced by London on da Track
Albums produced by Mike Will Made It
Albums produced by Southside (record producer)
Albums produced by TM88
Collaborative albums
Epic Records compilation albums
YSL Records albums
Atlantic Records compilation albums